Maigret's Mistake (French:Maigret se trompe) is a 1953 detective novel by the Belgian writer Georges Simenon featuring his character Jules Maigret. It was translated into English in 1954.

References

1953 Belgian novels
Maigret novels
Presses de la Cité books